= Keepgo =

Cellular service provider

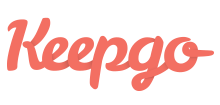
- Industry: Wireless services
- Founded: 2011; 15 years ago
- Headquarters: Delaware, USA
- Area served: Worldwide
- Key people: David Lipovkov (CEO)
- Products: Lifetime eSIM, Lifetime SIM Cards, Lifetime WiFi Hotspot, eSIM White Label, API SIM Card
- Website: keepgo.com

Keepgo is an American telecom company founded by David Lipovkov and Guy Zbarsky.

== History ==
In 2011, Keepgo was founded by David Lipovkov, and Guy Zbarsky. Zbarsky left the company in 2018.

In 2015, Keepgo expanded its services to provide international travelers with an internet connection abroad.
